Nelson's giant deer mouse (Megadontomys nelsoni) is a species of rodent in the family Cricetidae.
It is found only in Mexico.

References

 Musser, G. G. and M. D. Carleton. 2005. Superfamily Muroidea. pp. 894–1531 in Mammal Species of the World a Taxonomic and Geographic Reference. D. E. Wilson and D. M. Reeder eds. Johns Hopkins University Press, Baltimore.

Megadontomys
Mammals described in 1898
Taxonomy articles created by Polbot
Taxa named by Clinton Hart Merriam